Pseudochazara watsoni is a species of butterfly in the family Nymphalidae. It is confined to Kotal Pass, Khuskak village, central Afghanistan.

Flight period 
The species is univoltine and is on wing from July to August.

Food plants
Larvae feed on grasses.

External links
 Satyrinae of the Western Palearctic - Pseudochazara watsoni

Pseudochazara
Butterflies described in 1956